Lieutenant-General Sir William Stewart, GCB (10 January 1774 – 7 January 1827) was a British military officer who was the first Commanding Officer of the Rifle Corps, a Division Commander in the Peninsular War and a Scottish Member of Parliament (MP) in the British Parliament.

Early life
William Stewart, born on 10 January 1774, was the fourth (second surviving) son of John Stewart, 7th Earl of Galloway (1736–1806), and his second wife, Anne (1742/3–1830), daughter of Sir James Dashwood, 2nd Baronet. Charles James Stewart the second Bishop of Quebec, was his younger brother.

Member of Parliament
He represented Saltash in Cornwall from 1795 to 1796, Wigtownshire 1796–1802, the Wigtown Burghs 1803–1805 and Wigtownshire again 1812–1816.

Early military success
Stewart entered the British Army in 1786 as a twelve-year-old Ensign in the 42nd Foot. His first active service was in the West Indies Campaign of 1793–94, where he was wounded. After further service in the West Indies, when he commanded the 67th Foot at San Domingo (1796–98), Stewart returned to Europe and was given permission to serve with Britain's Austrian and Russian allies in Italy, Swabia and Switzerland during the campaign of 1799.

Stewart was intensely interested in weapons and tactics. It was probably his observations in 1799 of 'light infantry' and Tyrolese and Croat soldiers that did not fight in the rigid formations adopted by normal infantry units that led him to propose that the British Army should include a permanent force of 'light infantry', equipped with rifles. His ideas won support, especially from the influential Equerry to the King, Colonel Coote Manningham, who Stewart had first met in the West Indies.

In March 1800 an experimental 'Corps of Riflemen' was established. In August Stewart commanded it at the amphibious attack on Ferrol, where he was severely wounded in the chest as he led his riflemen up the cliffs. In October 1800 the Corps was gazetted as an established unit, with Manningham as colonel and Stewart as its first lieutenant-colonel and commanding officer.

Stewart's Standing Orders for the Rifle Corps, which later became the famous 95th Foot (Rifle Brigade), show how advanced his tactical thinking was compared to that of his contemporaries. He devised and implemented specially adapted forms of drill and manoeuvre, medals for bravery and good conduct, classification in shooting ability, a school and a library for the soldiers, while requiring every Rifles officer to get to know each of his men as individuals.

Shortly after Stewart's twenty-seventh birthday he was appointed to command the 895 soldiers (114 from the Rifle Corps and 781 from the 49th Regiment) that were to serve as marines in the fleet sent to the Baltic in 1801. He was stationed on the quarter-deck of Admiral Nelson's flagship HMS Elephant throughout the great naval Battle of Copenhagen on 2 April 1801. Nelson reported that "The Honourable Colonel Stewart did me the favour to be aboard the Elephant; and himself, with every officer and soldier under his orders, shared with pleasure the toils and dangers of the day" (Stewart's detachment lost 4 dead and 6 wounded).

Stewart was chosen for the honour of carrying to London the despatches reporting the victory and was included by name in the Thanks of Parliament voted on 16 April 1801. Six days later he received an official letter of promotion to full colonel, effective from the day of the Battle of Copenhagen. Nelson wrote to Lord St Vincent praising "Colonel Stewart, who is an excellent and indefatigable young man, and depend upon it, the rising hope of our army".

Nelson wrote at least eleven letters to Stewart in the four years between Copenhagen and his death at Trafalgar, which were included in the collection of Stewart's papers privately published as "The Cumloden Papers".

In 1802 the Rifle Corps was redesignated as the 95th (Rifle) Regiment and together with the 43rd and 52nd Foot was formed into the famous Light Brigade commanded by Sir John Moore. Stewart was the first colonel of the 95th, but soon had to hand over its operational command when he was appointed to be a brigadier-general. Stewart's heart still lay with the Rifles, and in 1805 he published "Outlines of a Plan for the General Reform of the British Land Forces", which advocated general adoption of many of the innovations he had already made within the 95th.

Stewart held important commands in the expeditions to Egypt in 1807 and to Walcheren in 1809, before being sent to Spain in 1810. Although Stewart was still junior as a major-general, he was given the crucial task of commanding the besieged garrison of the vital port of Cadiz and initially put directly under the orders of General Arthur Wellesley, 1st Duke of Wellington. This led to an appointment to command a brigade in the 2nd Division of the army in the Peninsula, and in December 1810 Stewart took over as commander of 2nd Division.

Division commander under Wellington

At the Battle of Albuera on 16 May 1811, Stewart led the 2nd Division, which bore the brunt of Marshal Nicolas Soult's flank attack. He wheeled Lieut-Col John Colborne's brigade to attack the left flank of Soult's massive French column. At first, the manoeuvre went well, as British musketry savaged the French infantry. Suddenly attacked from flank and rear by mounted Polish lancers and French hussars, three of Colborne's regiments were massacred, losing 1,250 men; only 400 escaped. At that battle, Stewart's other two brigades also suffered severely from point-blank French cannon and musket fire, but this was not his fault. In an epic struggle, the survivors of his division held back the French until the 4th Division saved the day. Glover, historian of the Peninsular War, wrote, "As a battalion commander, Stewart was surpassed only by Moore; as a general he was a menace".

Wellington wrote of him, "It is necessary that Stewart should be under the particular charge of somebody". After Albuera, Wellington found that "somebody" in the person of Lieutenant-General Rowland Hill. For the rest of the Peninsular War, Stewart and his 2nd Division usually served under Hill's competent supervision. He fought in Hill's corps in the Burgos campaign in autumn 1812 and at the Battle of Vitoria in 1813.

On 15 November 1812, Soult's 80,000 Frenchmen confronted Wellington's 65,000 Anglo-Portuguese near Salamanca. When Soult failed to attack, Wellington ordered a withdrawal to Portugal. During the retreat, Stewart (temporarily in charge of the 1st Division) and two other division commanders disobeyed their commander's orders. Stewart, Wellington wrote, "and certain other generals held a Council of War to decide whether to obey my orders to march by a particular road. He [Stewart], at the head, decided they would not; they marched by a road leading they knew not where, and when I found them in the morning they were in the utmost confusion, not knowing where to go and what to do".

On the opening day of the Battle of the Pyrenees at Maya Pass, Stewart concluded that the French would not attack, then rode ten miles to the rear. When the battle began, his 2nd Division was left to fight all morning under an inexperienced brigade commander and lost 1,347 men. Still in Hill's corps, Stewart fought at the battles of the Nive, Orthez and Toulouse during Wellington's 1814 invasion of southern France.

Awards, thanks and retirement
For his services in the Peninsula Stewart received the Gold Cross with two clasps, the Portuguese Order of the Tower and Sword, and the Spanish Order of San Fernando. On 2 January 1815 (on the enlargement of the order of the Bath) he received the G.C.B. Stewart had been M.P. for Saltash in 1795, and for Wigtonshire from 1796 onward, and on 24 June 1814 the speaker thanked him in his place, on behalf of the house, for his share in the victories of Vittoria and Orthes, and in the intermediate operations.

Stewart saw no further service. His health was broken by seventeen campaigns, in which he had received six wounds and four contusions, and in 1816 he resigned his seat in parliament. In July 1818 he was transferred to the colonelcy of the 1st Battalion of what had then become the Rifle Brigade. He settled at Cumloden on the borders of Wigton and Kirkcudbrightshire, near the family seat. He died there on 7 January 1827, and was buried at Minigaff.

Family
In 1804 Stewart married Frances, daughter of the Hon. John Douglas (second son of the Earl of Morton), and he left one son, Horatio, a captain in the Rifle Brigade, and one daughter, Louisa.

Notes

References
 

Attribution:
  Endnotes:
The Cumloden Papers, printed for private circulation in 1871, containing a memoir, with extracts from Stewart's journals, and correspondence with Nelson and Wellington
 Cope's Hist. of the Rifle Brigade
 Verner's The first British Rifle Corps
 Gent. Mag. 1827, i. 175
 Royal Military Calendar, ii. 322
 Wellington Despatches
 Napier's War in the Peninsula
 Beresford's Further Strictures on the War in the Peninsula, p. 159.

Further reading
 
 

|-

1774 births
1827 deaths
British Army commanders of the Napoleonic Wars
Tory MPs (pre-1834)
Members of the Parliament of Great Britain for constituencies in Cornwall
Members of the Parliament of Great Britain for Scottish constituencies
British MPs 1790–1796
British MPs 1796–1800
Members of the Parliament of the United Kingdom for Scottish constituencies
UK MPs 1801–1802
UK MPs 1802–1806
UK MPs 1812–1818
Younger sons of earls
42nd Regiment of Foot officers
British Army generals
67th Regiment of Foot officers
British Army personnel of the French Revolutionary Wars
Rifle Brigade officers